Jacqueline "Jacquie" Robbins and Joyce Robbins (born September 9, 1949) are twin American-Canadian actresses best known for playing the Blind Twins in The Wicker Man and for playing the White Faced Women in A Series of Unfortunate Events. They are based in Vancouver, British Columbia.

Biography
Jacqueline "Jacquie" and Joyce Robbins were born in Rochester, Minnesota and raised in Calgary, Alberta. They would put on plays as children with the neighborhood kids. As adults, they graduated at University of Calgary with BAs in 1972 and begin teaching there for 15 years. They got their first onscreen acting job in the 1976 film Buffalo Bill and the Indians, or Sitting Bull's History Lesson in background roles.

The Robbins Sisters have appeared in numerous works including the 2006 remake of The Wicker Man and the Tom Cochrane music video for "Life Is a Highway". They starred in a short film as the title leads in Mina.Minerva. They received higher recognition for their roles as the White Faced Women in the Netflix adaptation of A Series of Unfortunate Events.

Personal life
They both briefly dated another pair of twins named Malcolm and Myron before "going [their] separate ways". They have the unique ability to speak and sing in unison on the spot.

Filmography

References

External links

1949 births
Living people
Actresses from Minnesota
American emigrants to Canada
Canadian film actresses
Canadian television actresses
Identical twin actresses
People from Rochester, Minnesota